Hasdai ben Abraham Crescas (c. 1340 in Barcelona – 1410/11 in Zaragoza) was a Spanish-Jewish philosopher and a renowned halakhist (teacher of Jewish law).  Along with Maimonides ("Rambam"), Gersonides ("Ralbag"), and Joseph Albo, he is known as one of the major practitioners of the rationalist approach to Jewish philosophy.

Biography

Hasdai Crescas came from a family of scholars. He was the grandson of the Talmudist Hasdai ben Judah Crescas, and a disciple of the Talmudist and philosopher Nissim ben Reuben, known as the RaN. Following in the footsteps of his teacher he became a Talmudic authority and a philosopher of great originality. He is considered important in the history of modern thought for his deep influence on Baruch Spinoza.

After leaving Barcelona, he held the administrative position of crown rabbi in Aragon.  He seems to have been active as a teacher. Among his fellow students and friends, Isaac ben Sheshet (known as the RIBaSH), famous for his responsa, takes precedence. Joseph Albo is the best known of his pupils, but at least two others have won recognition, Rabbi Mattathias of Saragossa, and Rabbi Zechariah ha-Levi.

Crescas was a man of means. As such he was appointed sole executor of the will of his uncle Vitalis Azday by the King John I of Aragon in 1393. Still, though enjoying the high esteem even of prominent non-Jews, he did not escape the common fate of his coreligionists. Imprisoned with his teacher upon a false accusation of host desecration in 1378, he suffered personal indignities because he was a Jew. His only son died in a massacre in Barcelona in 1391, a martyr for his faith, during the anti-Judaic persecutions of that period. Nevertheless, he kept his faith.

Notwithstanding this bereavement, his mental powers were unbroken; for the works that have made him famous were written after that terrible year.  In 1401-02 he visited Joseph Orabuena at Pamplona at the request of the King of Navarre, who paid the expenses of his journey to various Navarrese towns (Jacobs, l.c. Nos. 1570, 1574). He was at that time described as "Rav of Saragossa."

Works
His works on Jewish law, if indeed ever committed to writing – have not reached us. But his concise philosophical work Or Adonai, The Light of the Lord became a classical Jewish refutation of medieval Aristotelianism, and a harbinger of the scientific revolution in the 16th century.

Three of his writings have been preserved:
His primary work, Or Adonai, The Light of the Lord.
An exposition and refutation of the main doctrines of Christianity. This treatise was written in Catalan in 1398. The Catalan original is no longer extant; but a Hebrew translation by Joseph ibn Shem-Tov, with the title  ("Refutation of the Cardinal Principles of the Christians"), has been preserved. The work was composed at the solicitation of Spanish noblemen. Crescas' object in writing what is virtually an apologetic treatise on Judaism was to present the reasons which held the Jews fast to their ancestral faith.
His letter to the congregations of Avignon, published as an appendix to Wiener's edition of "Shevet Yehudah" (see above), in which he relates the incidents of the persecution of 1391.

List of works 

The Light of the Lord (Hebrew:  Or Adonai or Or Hashem)
The Refutation of the Christian Principles (polemics and some philosophy)
 Daniel Lasker: Sefer Bittul Iqqarei Ha-Nozrim by R. Hasdai Crescas. Albany 1992. 
 Carlos del Valle Rodríguez: La inconsistencia de los dogmas cristianos: Biṭṭul 'Iqqare ha-Noṣrim le-R. Ḥasday Crescas. Madrid 2000. 
Passover Sermon (religious philosophy and some halakha)

References

Further reading 
 Harry Austryn Wolfson, Crescas' Critique of Aristotle. Cambridge, Harvard University Press, 1929.
 Warren Zev Harvey, Physics and Metaphysics in Hasdai Crescas,  Amsterdam Studies in Jewish Thought, J.C. Gieben, Amsterdam, 1998.
 Warren Zev Harvey, Great Spirit and Creativity within the Jewish Nation: Rabbi Hasdai Crescas(Hebrew), Mercaz, Zalman Shazar, Jerusalem 2010.

External links

1340 births
1410s deaths
14th-century Catalan rabbis
14th-century Spanish philosophers
14th-century Jewish theologians
15th-century Catalan rabbis
15th-century Spanish philosophers
Determinists
Jewish apologists
Jewish philosophers
Medieval Catalan-language writers
Philosophers from Catalonia
Philosophers of Judaism
Writers from Barcelona